Monte Lozzo is a mountain of the Veneto, Italy. It is also a minor tourist attraction.

Protection Status 
Monte Lozzo has been is covered by the European Union's Natura 2000 Project. It is a Special Protection Area (SPA) for 45 species, which include 33 species of birds such as the Eurasian sparrowhawk and the Nightjar.

References 

Mountains of Veneto